DreamWorks Animation LLC (DWA, also known as DreamWorks Animation Studios and simply known as DreamWorks) is an American animation studio that produces animated films and television programs and is a subsidiary of Universal Pictures, a division of NBCUniversal, which is itself a division of Comcast. The studio has released 44 feature films , including several of the highest-grossing animated films of all time, with Shrek 2 (2004) having been the highest at the time of its release. The studio's first film, Antz, was released on October 2, 1998, and its latest film was Puss in Boots: The Last Wish, which was released on December 21, 2022; their upcoming slate of films includes Ruby Gillman, Teenage Kraken on June 30, 2023, Trolls Band Together on November 17, 2023, and Kung Fu Panda 4 on March 8, 2024. Additionally, two untitled films are scheduled to be released on February 9, 2024, and September 27, 2024.

Formed as a division of DreamWorks Pictures in 1994 with alumni from Amblin Entertainment's former animation branch Amblimation, it was spun off into a separate company in 2004. NBCUniversal acquired DreamWorks Animation at a cost of $3.8 billion in 2016. The studio originally made some traditionally animated films, as well as two stop-motion co-productions with Aardman Animations, but now exclusively relies on computer animation. Its productions, including The Prince of Egypt, Wallace & Gromit: The Curse of the Were-Rabbit, and the Shrek, Madagascar, Kung Fu Panda, and How to Train Your Dragon franchises, have received several accolades, including three Academy Awards, 41 Emmy Awards, numerous Annie Awards, and multiple Golden Globe and BAFTA nominations.

Films produced by DreamWorks Animation were originally distributed by DreamWorks Pictures until 2005. Paramount Pictures distributed its releases from 2006 through 2012, and 20th Century Fox (currently known as 20th Century Studios) did the same from 2013 through 2017. All DWA films from 2019 onward have been released through Universal Pictures, which also owns most of the rights to its back catalogue.

History

DreamWorks SKG era (1994–2004) 

On October 12, 1994, a trio of entertainment players, film director and producer Steven Spielberg, former Disney executive Jeffrey Katzenberg, and music executive David Geffen, founded DreamWorks SKG (the three letters taken from the surnames of the founders). To build the talent base, Spielberg brought over artists from his London-based studio, Amblimation, while Katzenberg recruited some of the top animation staff from Disney. Some of Amblimation's artists came to DreamWorks in 1995, when the studio's last feature, Balto, was completed, with the rest doing so following the studio's closure in 1997.

In 1995, DreamWorks signed a co-production deal with Pacific Data Images to form subsidiary PDI, LLC (PDI owned 60% of PDI, LLC, while DreamWorks SKG owned 40%). This new unit would produce computer-generated feature films, beginning with Antz in 1998. In the same year, DreamWorks SKG produced The Prince of Egypt, which used both CGI technology and traditional animation techniques.

In 1997, DreamWorks partnered with British stop-motion animation studio Aardman Animations to co-produce and distribute Chicken Run (2000), a stop-motion film already in pre-production. Two years later they extended the deal for an additional four films. With Aardman doing stop-motion and the existing traditional and computer productions, they covered all three major styles of animation. This partnership had DreamWorks participating in the production of stop-motion films in Bristol, and also had Aardman participating in some of the CGI films made in the United States.

Three years later, DreamWorks SKG created DreamWorks Animation, a new business division that would regularly produce both types of animated feature films. The same year DW acquired majority interest (90%) in PDI, and reformed it into PDI/DreamWorks, the Northern California branch of its new business division.

In 2001, Shrek was released and went on to win the first Academy Award for Best Animated Feature Film. Due to the success of CGI animated films, DWA decided the same year to exit hand-drawn animation business after their next two films, Spirit: Stallion of the Cimarron (2002) and Sinbad: Legend of the Seven Seas (2003), making a total of four hand-drawn films. Beginning with Shrek 2 (2004), all released films, other than some co-produced with Aardman, were expected to be produced with CGI. The releases of Shrek 2 and Shark Tale also made DWA the first animation studio to produce two CGI animated features in a single year.

Public corporation (2004–2016) 
The animation division was spun off into a publicly traded company named DreamWorks Animation SKG, Inc. (doing business as DreamWorks Animation LLC) on October 27, 2004, and traded via the New York Stock Exchange. Katzenberg headed the new division, while Spielberg and Geffen remained on board as investors and consultants. DWA also inherited interests in PDI/DreamWorks. They made an agreement with their former parent to distribute all of their films until they delivered twelve new films, or December 12, 2010, whichever came last.

On January 31, 2006, DWA entered into a distribution agreement with Paramount Pictures, which recently acquired DWA's former parent and distribution partner, DreamWorks SKG. The agreement granted Paramount the worldwide rights to distribute all animated films, including all of their previously released animated films (Antz, The Prince of Egypt, The Road to El Dorado, Chicken Run, Shrek, Spirit: Stallion of the Cimarron, Sinbad: Legend of the Seven Seas, Shrek 2, Shark Tale, Madagascar and Wallace & Gromit: The Curse of the Were-Rabbit), until the delivery of 13 new animated feature films or December 31, 2012, whichever came last. Wallace & Gromit: The Curse of the Were-Rabbit was the last film distributed by its former distribution arm and Over the Hedge was the first film distributed by Paramount.

DWA's partnership with Aardman ended after the release of Flushed Away in November 2006, having delivered three out of five films. The announcement was made before the film's release, on October 3, citing "creative differences". DWA retained the co-ownership of rights to all films co-produced with Aardman, with an exception being Wallace & Gromit: The Curse of the Were-Rabbit (2005), for which they only kept the worldwide distribution rights.

On March 13, 2007, DreamWorks Animation announced it would release all of its films, beginning with Monsters vs. Aliens (2009), in stereoscopic 3D. Together with Intel, they co-developed a new 3D film-making technology, InTru3D.

In 2008, DWA extended its production pipeline into Bangalore, India, where they established a special unit within Technicolor, named DreamWorks Dedicated Unit. The unit is owned by Technicolor, but DreamWorks hires and trains the animators, who then contribute to DreamWorks projects. DDU at first worked only on TV specials, such as Merry Madagascar (2009), Scared Shrekless (2010), and DVD projects. Eventually they started contributing to DreamWorks' feature films as well, beginning with animating part of Puss in Boots (2011).

Since 2009, the studio has been regularly listed in Fortune Magazine's "100 Best Companies to Work For". As the only entertainment company on the list, they ranked 47th in 2009, 6th in 2010, 10th in 2011, 14th in 2012, and 12th in 2013.

Beginning in 2010, the studio had planned to release five feature films over the course of every two years, but the next year the studio revisited their plans, "but beyond 2012, Katzenberg said the studio will play it by year, even if that means abandoning his proclamation that DWA would try to release three pictures in a single year, every other year." In 2010, DWA became the first animation studio that released three feature-length CG-animated films in a year. The same year, the company purchased the film rights to the Trolls franchise.

Diversification and expansion (2012–2015) 
In July 2012, DreamWorks Animation won a $155 million bid to acquire Classic Media, which has since been renamed to DreamWorks Classics. In August 2012, DreamWorks Animation formed a joint venture with Chinese investment companies to establish a Shanghai-based entertainment company, named Oriental DreamWorks, to develop and produce original Chinese films and their derivatives.

According to a Los Angeles Times report, DreamWorks Animation was in talks with Sony Pictures to distribute its upcoming films, such as the 2013 releases of The Croods and Turbo. The report also mentioned a possibility where Sony would handle United States distribution while 20th Century Fox would handle international distribution. Renewal of the deal with Paramount was also open, but only with more favorable terms for Paramount (they even offered a one-year extension of the deal, but Katzenberg desired to get a better deal). Around the same time, DreamWorks Animation entered talks with Warner Bros. for a potential distribution deal as well, only to be turned down by the studio.

In August 2012, DreamWorks Animation signed a five-year distribution deal with 20th Century Fox for all territories. However, the deal did not include the distribution rights of previously released films, which DWA acquired from Paramount later in 2014. Rise of the Guardians (2012) was the last DreamWorks Animation film to be distributed by Paramount, and The Croods became the first DreamWorks Animation film to be distributed by Fox.

On April 11, 2013, DreamWorks Animation announced that it has acquired the intellectual property for the Trolls franchise from the Dam Family and Dam Things. DreamWorks Animation, which has "big plans for the franchise", has become the exclusive worldwide licensor of the merchandise rights, except for Scandinavia, where Dam Things remains the licensor. On May 1, Katzenberg and DWA announced their intent to purchase YouTube channel AwesomenessTV, which was finalized later in the month.

The following month, DWA announced a multi-year content deal to provide 300 hours of exclusive original content to the video on demand Internet streaming media provider, Netflix. Part of the intent of the deal was in part to establish a more reliable income for DWA to defray the financial risk of solely relying on the theatrical film market. The next day, DWA completed a five-year licensing agreement with Super RTL to start that September for the Classic Media library and the Netflix slate. With the Netflix and Super RTL deals in place for TV, DWA announced executive hiring for its new television group, DreamWorks Animation Television in late July. Former Nickelodeon senior executive Margie Cohn became Head of Television for the group. In September that same year, DreamWorks announced that it has acquired the TV library of London-based Chapman Entertainment with the programs to distributed through DWA's UK-based TV distribution operation.

The next year, in February, DreamWorks announced the foundation of a new publishing division called DreamWorks Press, to publish books in print and digital form. In June, the rights to Felix the Cat were acquired by DreamWorks Animation from Felix the Cat Productions, owned by Don Oriolo. The same month, DreamWorksTV channel debuted on YouTube and operated by AwesomenessTV. DreamWorks Animation then purchased Paramount's distribution rights to the pre-2013 library in July, and since then, DreamWorks Animation's then-distribution partner 20th Century Fox has distributed the library on their behalf until 2018, in which DreamWorks Animation's sister studio Universal Pictures has assumed these responsibilities.

The studio was reported to be acquired twice in the end of 2014. First, it was reported in September that the Japanese conglomerate SoftBank was in talks to acquire DreamWorks Animation for a price of $3.4 billion, but the next day, it was reported that SoftBank had withdrawn its offer. Next on November 12, it was reported that Hasbro was in talks to buy DreamWorks Animation in November. The proposal reportedly calls for the combined company to take the name "DreamWorks-Hasbro" and for Jeffrey Katzenberg to become its chairman, but as a matter of policy, neither Hasbro nor DWA publicly comment on mergers and acquisitions. Two days later, the talks were reported to have fallen through.

DreamWorks Animation announced their launch into the television broadcasting business on December 9, 2014, by creating their own channel called the DreamWorks Channel. With HBO Asia handling affiliate sales, marketing and technical services, the network will launch in several Asian countries (except China and Japan) in the second half of 2015. The channel first premiered in English on August 1, 2015, and a Thai-dubbed channel launched in September 2015. Also in December, DWA sold a 25% stake in AwesomenessTV for $81.25 million to the Hearst Corporation.

On January 5, 2015, DreamWorks Animation announced that Bonnie Arnold, producer of the How to Train Your Dragon series and Mireille Soria, producer of the Madagascar series were named co-presidents of the studio's feature animation division. At the same time, it was also announced that Bill Damaschke will step down from his position as Chief Creative Officer. So far, under Arnold and Soria's current tenure they signed Jason Reitman and Edgar Wright to work on their own animation debuts. Two weeks later, PDI/DreamWorks completely shut down as part of its parent company's larger restructuring efforts.

Universal Pictures acquisition (2016–present) 
On April 28, 2016, Comcast officially announced that its NBCUniversal division intended on acquiring DreamWorks Animation for $3.8 billion, valuing the company at $41 per share. Jeffrey Katzenberg was to remain involved in the company as head of DreamWorks New Media, but was to cede control of the studio to Illumination's CEO Chris Meledandri, who would oversee both. The sale was approved by board members, but subject to regulatory approval.

At Guggenheim Partners' TMT Symposium, NBCUniversal CEO Steve Burke discussed how the purchase of DWA would fit into its business strategies. Burke explained that Meledandri planned to "take a lot of the existing DreamWorks franchises and add value as we create new franchises", and that the main goal was to "[take] the low-single-digit returns of the movie business and turn it into a different kind of business" by creating new intellectual property that can be merchandised and adapted into theme park attractions. Burke reaffirmed a commitment to animated features, stating that Universal would be able to release as many as four animated films per-year, divided between DreamWorks and Illumination. Burke also outlined that the purchase would be beneficial to Universal's expanding presence in China (where it is building a new Universal Studios park in Beijing).

DreamWorks Animation's last film distributed by 20th Century Fox was Captain Underpants: The First Epic Movie (2017), and their first film distributed by Universal Pictures was How to Train Your Dragon: The Hidden World (2019) with Abominable (2019), Trolls World Tour (2020) and The Croods 2: A New Age (2021), Spirit Untamed (2021), The Boss Baby: Family Business (2021), and The Bad Guys (2022) following afterwards, and with Puss in Boots: The Last Wish (2022).

On June 21, 2016, the acquisition was approved by the United States Department of Justice. The purchase was closed on August 22, 2016; the company now operates as a division of the Universal Filmed Entertainment Group.

Although a spokesperson stated that Meledandri would work with Universal Pictures to determine "the most effective path forward for Illumination and DreamWorks Animation", he did not take over DreamWorks as was previously announced, and the two studios remain separate. Bonnie Arnold and Mireille Soria retained their positions as co-presidents of DreamWorks' Feature Animation division, while Margie Cohn will lead a television animation division for the entire Universal Pictures group. DreamWorks' digital, marketing, consumer products, and gaming divisions will be absorbed into NBCUniversal.

On December 21, 2016, Mireille Soria stepped down from her position as co-president of DreamWorks' Feature Animation division.

In January 2017, Christopher DeFaria joined DreamWorks Animation in the newly created position of president of the DreamWorks Feature Animation Group. As president, DeFaria will oversee all aspects of DWA's feature animation business, including slate strategy, development, production; innovation and technology; and business affairs.

On August 1, 2017, it was announced that DreamWorks Animation and Blumhouse Productions would be working on Blumhouse's first animated film, Spooky Jack. The film was initially set to be released on September 17, 2021, but was removed from the release schedule as The Bad Guys took over its release date.

On October 6, 2017, it was announced that Abhijay Prakash would be COO of DWA. He was later promoted to president of the Universal Filmed Entertainment Group in February 2019 following the release of How to Train Your Dragon: The Hidden World, and DreamWorks Animation subsequently hired former Sony Pictures Imageworks head Randy Lake as the new chief operating officer of the company three months later.

On November 13, 2017, it was announced that DreamWorks Animation had started a shorts program, called DreamWorks Shorts, which will show original animated short films before DWA's feature films, much akin to what Pixar and Walt Disney Animation Studios do for their feature films. The first short film to be produced under the program was Bird Karma, which premiered in Spring 2018.

On February 2, 2018, CMC Capital Partners bought DreamWorks', Shanghai Media Group's, and Shanghai Alliance Investment's stakes in Oriental DreamWorks, owning the studio in its entirety; Oriental DreamWorks was later renamed to  Pearl Studio. Pearl Studio collaborated with DreamWorks to produce Abominable, with the film's original director, Jill Culton, returning.

On February 27, 2018, DreamWorks Animation announced that Kelly Betz has been promoted as Chief Financial Officer.

On May 2, 2018, Hulu announced its first license deal with DreamWorks Animation, becoming the exclusive streaming home for future DWA feature films, as well as library films. DWA had streamed exclusively through Netflix since 2013.

On July 25, 2018, Viacom Media Networks announced that it was in talks to acquire AwesomenessTV for a fraction of the company's $650 million valuation in 2016. Two days later on July 27, 2018, Viacom officially acquired AwesomenessTV for $25–50 million and integrated the company into Viacom Digital Studios. Jordan Levin will leave his position as CEO following the acquisition. However, the deal does not include the DreamWorksTV YouTube channel, which is still retained by NBCUniversal, where it will be integrated into NBCU Digital Enterprises Group, a new digital entertainment division led by President Maggie Suniewick. On July 30, 2018, Variety reported that the deal is worth at least $50 million.

On January 9, 2019, Christopher DeFaria stepped down from his position as president of the company, with DreamWorks Animation Television head Margie Cohn promoted to oversee all film and television operations.

On January 16, 2020, five new DreamWorks Animation shows were announced for Hulu and NBCUniversal's new video streaming service Peacock.

On August 5, 2022, DreamWorks announced plans to release their rendering software MoonRay as an open-source software in late 2022.

Logo 
DreamWorks Animation is known for its logo, which is a boy fishing on the moon. The logo originated from DreamWorks Pictures, debuting in 1997. It was later used as the standard logo for DreamWorks Animation from Antz (1998) to Sinbad: Legend of the Seven Seas (2003).

In 2004, DreamWorks unveiled its own logo, in which the boy flies up to the moon via balloons. It originally had music adapted from the track "Fairytale" for the film Shrek (2001), the logo was composed by Harry Gregson-Williams, one of the co-composers of Shrek and the composer of the  whole Shrek franchise as well as other DreamWorks films. The logo was used from Shrek 2 (2004) to Monsters vs. Aliens (2009).

In 2010, DreamWorks unveiled a new logo, this time with the boy fishing on the moon in space. An updated version of the fanfare accompanied this logo, and the logo would be used from How to Train Your Dragon (2010) to Captain Underpants: The First Epic Movie (2017).

Two years after its acquisition by Universal Pictures in 2016, a new logo was introduced. It is said that it pays homage to the evolution of animation. It received a new fanfare composed by John Powell, the other composer of the first Shrek and other DreamWorks films, adapting some cues from Shrek 2 and tones from John Williams' DreamWorks Pictures fanfare to create the music for the logo. The logo debuted on the first trailer of How to Train Your Dragon: The Hidden World (2019) in 2018, but the full animated version and the new fanfare debuted on February 22, 2019, with the release of the film, for which Powell also composed the score.

On November 25, 2022, a new logo was announced. The boy on the moon was redubbed as the Moon Child to relate to anyone. The logo showcases the Moon Child flying on the crescent moon, interacting with several DreamWorks characters before settling on the moon. It features characters from The Bad Guys, How to Train Your Dragon, Kung Fu Panda, The Boss Baby, Trolls, and Shrek, and a rearranged score by Harry Gregson-Williams, finally returning after making the fanfare for the 2010 logo, with elements of the previous fanfare by John Powell. The logo was created by production designer Kendal Cronkhite (the Trolls films), Suzanne Buirgy (Home and Abominable) and a team of 10–40 people, taking eight months to complete. The characters that appear in the logo also have different designs to better fit in the continuity, and character appearance is expected to vary with each film by 2023. It made its debut on November 22, 2022, as an unlisted video on DreamWorks' YouTube channel and made its on-screen debut on the sneak preview of Puss in Boots: The Last Wish.

Animation process 
Many of DreamWorks Animation's films are animated internally at their Glendale campus, but some of their films were animated by Pacific Data Images, a subsidiary of DreamWorks, until its closure in 2015, in a somewhat similar fashion to Illumination, which has most of its films animated by Illumination Mac Guff. Films include Shrek and its two sequels, the Madagascar film series, and Megamind. Puss in Boots and Penguins of Madagascar were partially animated at its Bangalore campus.

Additionally, DreamWorks occasionally outsources its animation production to other studios. For example, Captain Underpants: The First Epic Movie was animated by Mikros Image alongside Technicolor Animation Productions and Spirit Untamed, and production assets for The Boss Baby: Family Business and The Bad Guys were provided by Jellyfish Pictures, which also did the marketing custom animation for Trolls World Tour alongside Minimo VFX, which provided rigging for Spirit Untamed.

Most of DreamWorks' films tend to cost between $125–165 million, but Monsters vs. Aliens is the studio's most expensive film to date, with a budget of $175 million. After the release of How to Train Your Dragon: The Hidden World, DreamWorks films started to have much lower costs in the $65–100 million range, similar to its sister studio, Illumination.

Partnerships 
DreamWorks Animation has an ongoing partnership with Hewlett-Packard that has been active since 2002, and the studio exclusively uses HP workstations and servers. In 2005, DWA partnered with HP to introduce HP Halo Telepresence Solutions, technologies that allow people in different locations to communicate in a face-to-face environment in real time.

In 2005, AMD signed a three-year deal to provide Opteron processors to the studio. This relationship ended in 2008, and DreamWorks announced that they would use Intel Xeon processors for all future productions. The same year, both companies announced a technology called InTru3D that allows DreamWorks to produce all of their future films in 3D, beginning with Monsters vs. Aliens.

DreamWorks also has a partnership with NetApp in order to supply cloud-based storage that allows the company to complete its films.

The DreamWorks Experience: Royal Caribbean Cruiseline 

The DreamWorks Experience is a package of character interactions and experiences, including shows: Ice shows, Aqua shows, Sailaway parties, parades, wow moments, meet and greets, and character dining, featuring from the Shrek franchise: Shrek, Princess Fiona, Puss in Boots, Kitty Softpaws. The Kung Fu Panda Franchise: Po the Panda, Tigress the Tiger. The Madagascar franchise: Alex the Lion, Gloria the Hippo, King Julien the Ringtail Lemur,  Mort the goodman Lemur, The Penguins: Skipper, Kowalski, Rico, Private. How to Train your Dragon franchise: Toothless, Meatlug, Stoick, Valka, Gobber, and other DreamWorks Animation characters.

The DreamWorks Experience was announced for Royal Caribbean cruise ships, including ships of the Freedom Class : Freedom and Liberty, Voyager Class : Voyager of the Seas Oasis Class: Oasis, Allure, Harmony, and Quantum Class: Quantum, Anthem, Ovation, in June 2010. On April 11, 2019, the DreamWorks program was removed from all ships due to DreamWorks and Royal Caribbean not renewing their contract.

The DreamWorks Experience: Gaylord Hotels (2011–2015) 

In April 2011, the DreamWorks Experience was announced for resorts owned by Gaylord Entertainment in Nashville, Orlando, Dallas, and Washington, D.C. for a four-year contract ending January 1, 2015. After Gaylord was bought out by Marriott, Marriott owners did not renew the contract.

DreamPlay by DreamWorks: City of Dreams Manila 
The world's first indoor interactive play and creativity center theme park located within City of Dreams Manila opened on June 12, 2015.

DreamWorks Water Park 

On July 11, 2012, then CEO Jeffrey Katzenberg announced it would build the DreamWorks Water Park, an indoor water park at American Dream  in East Rutherford, New Jersey. The park would have attractions from Shrek, Madagascar, Kung Fu Panda  and How To Train Your Dragon franchises. On November 21, 2019, days before the planned opening, it was delayed to March 19, 2020. However, due to the COVID-19 pandemic, the park officially opened on October 1, 2020.

Filmography

Franchises

Notable people 

 Alessandro Pepe, FX Animator

See also 
 List of unproduced DreamWorks Animation projects
 List of unproduced Universal Pictures animated projects
 List of Paramount Pictures theatrical animated feature films
 List of 20th Century Studios theatrical animated feature films
 List of Universal Pictures theatrical animated feature films
 List of DreamWorks Pictures films
 DreamWorks Pictures
 Illumination
 Universal Animation Studios
 Amblimation
 Aardman Animations
 Pacific Data Images
 Pearl Studio
 List of animated feature films of the 1990s
 List of animated feature films of the 2000s
 List of animated feature films of the 2010s
 List of animated feature films of the 2020s

Notes

References

External links 

 

 

 
1994 establishments in California
Companies formerly listed on the New York Stock Exchange
American animation studios
Film production companies of the United States
Companies based in Glendale, California
American companies established in 1994
Mass media companies established in 1994
Entertainment companies established in 1994
Steven Spielberg
Jeffrey Katzenberg
David Geffen
Universal Pictures subsidiaries
Former Viacom subsidiaries
NBCUniversal
2004 initial public offerings
2016 mergers and acquisitions
Corporate spin-offs
American corporate subsidiaries
Comcast subsidiaries